Ctenomeristis is a genus of small moths belonging to the snout moth family (Pyralidae).  They are part of the tribe Phycitini within the huge snout moth subfamily Phycitinae.

Moths of this genus can usually be distinguished from related moths by their forewing veins. They have 11 veins, with vein 7 missing altogether and veins 4 and 5 as well as 8, 9 and 10 being connected proximally.

Species
Species of Ctenomeristis are:
 Ctenomeristis albata
 Ctenomeristis almella
 Ctenomeristis ebriola
 Ctenomeristis kaltenbachi
 Ctenomeristis ochrodepta  Meyrick, 1929b (from Marquesas)
 Ctenomeristis paucicornuti
 Ctenomeristis sebasmia (mostly placed in Eremographa)
 Ctenomeristis shafferi
 Ctenomeristis subfuscella
 Ctenomeristis vojnitsi

Footnotes

References

  (1986): Pyralidae and Microlepidoptera of the Marquesas Archipelago. Smithsonian Contributions to Zoology 416: 1-485. PDF fulltext (214 MB!)
  (2004): Butterflies and Moths of the World, Generic Names and their Type-species – Ctenomeristis. Version of 5 November 2004. Retrieved 29 May 2011.
  (2009): Lepidoptera and Some Other Life Forms – Ctenomeristis. Version of 9 April 2009. Retrieved 29 May 2011.

Phycitini
Pyralidae genera